José Bermejo López (1894 in Cartagena, Murcia – 1971) was a Spanish military officer and colonial administrator.

Biography 
Bermejo entered the Spanish Army at an early age, where he made his professional career. At the time of the Spanish coup of July 1936 he was posted in Temsamane commune, in the Spanish protectorate in Morocco. After the outbreak of the military uprising, Bermejo joined the Nationalist faction and subsequently participated in the Spanish Civil War.

In May 1940, with the rank of colonel, Bermejo was appointed Politico-Military Governor of Ifni and the Sahara. During the time he held the position, he did an important work in Spanish Sahara, establishing the administrative capital in Sidi Ifni and dividing the territory into three districts. In 1945, he also created the weekly  (acronym for África Occidental Española or "Spanish West Africa"), that would soon become the main periodical of the territory. In 1946 the Francoist regime made an administrative reform of the African territories, which became the Spanish West Africa. Bermejo continued in his post (now as Governor of the Spanish West Africa), remaining there until August 1949.

In 1958 he was appointed information advisor at the Spanish embassy in Tunisia, a position he held until 1965.

References

Bibliography 
 
 
 
 
 

1894 births
1971 deaths
Military personnel from Cartagena, Spain
20th-century Spanish military personnel
Spanish colonial governors and administrators
History of Western Sahara
Spanish military personnel of the Spanish Civil War (National faction)